is a Japanese film, released in 2012. Directed by Shinpei Hayashiya. The film centres on the Japanese art of "sit down" comedy, Rakugo. The film was shown as part of the 3rd Old Town Taito International Comedy Film Festival in September 2010, as well as the eigasai Film Festival  in Czechoslovakia and was made with the assistance of the Rakugo Kyokai Association.

Plotline 
The main character, Masato, after seeing  a rakugo performance, is himself inspired to enter the world of Rakugo storytelling. He becomes the apprentice of an established rakugo master by the name of Koroku Imadoya (Played by Pierre Taki). After a while, Masato receives the name “Koharu” and is himself promoted to “zenza” (performer who opens as first act). Koharu's life becomes challenging with his position as zenza,  as well as his duties with Master Koroku and his wife Aoi (Tomoko Tabata), however, an unexpected incident happens that changes his life.

Cast 
 Anna Ishibashi
 Pierre Taki
 Shinkyo Kokontei
 Tokimatsu Sanyutei
 Kyūsaku Shimada
 Tomoko Tabata

References

External links 
 
 Rakugo Story at Eigapedia

2010s Japanese films
Rakugo